H.A.L. School, Lucknow is a CBSE affiliated school situated in the campus of Hindustan Aeronautics Limited Lucknow (Accessories) Division. It has three subsections, viz. Junior Section (Nursery to Class V), middle section (Class VI to Class VIII) and English medium and senior secondary section (class IX to XII). It is run  by an independent society HES Lucknow registered under the society registration act. It was founded in 1974. Its current principal is Smt. Kiran Mishra. The school has large play grounds, swimming pool, volleyball and basketball courts. Student Teacher ration is as low as 25:1 to focus on each student individually. The school organizes Science Exhibition, Annual Sports day, Health Seminars etc on regular basis every year.

References

External links
 HAL School

Primary schools in Uttar Pradesh
High schools and secondary schools in Uttar Pradesh
Schools in Lucknow
Educational institutions established in 1974
1974 establishments in Uttar Pradesh